Mary Murphy Schroeder (born December 4, 1940) is an American attorney and jurist serving as a senior United States circuit judge of the United States Court of Appeals for the Ninth Circuit.

Early life and education 

Born on December 4, 1940, in Boulder, Colorado, Schroeder received her Bachelor of Arts degree from Swarthmore College in 1962 and her Juris Doctor from the University of Chicago Law School in 1965, one of six women in her class. She received an honorary Doctor of Laws (Legum Doctor (LL.D.) from Swarthmore in May 2006.

Career 
Schroeder practiced as a trial attorney with the United States Department of Justice Civil Division from 1965 until 1969. She served as a law clerk to Justice Jesse Addison Udall of the Arizona Supreme Court in 1970. She joined the law firm of Lewis & Roca in Phoenix, Arizona, in 1971 and became a partner in 1973. She was appointed to the Arizona Court of Appeals in 1975 and served until 1979.

Schroeder was elected to the American Law Institute in 1974 and was elected to the ALI Council in 1993. She served as an Adviser on the Restatement Third of Agency and serves as an adviser on the Restatement Third, The Law of Consumer Contracts and Principles of Government Ethics.

Federal judicial service
Schroeder was nominated by President Jimmy Carter on May 3, 1979, to the United States Court of Appeals for the Ninth Circuit, to a new seat authorized by 92 Stat. 1629. She was confirmed by the United States Senate on September 25, 1979, and received her commission on September 26, 1979. She served as the first female chief judge of the Ninth Circuit from 2000 to 2007. She assumed senior status on December 31, 2011.

Notable cases 
 The northern spotted owl, a case related to the Endangered Species Act
 The Napster file trading software copyright infringement appeal.
 Hirabayashi v. United States coram nobis
 In CAPEEM v. Torlakson, Schroeder rejected a claim that California schools inaccurately portrayed Hinduism.
 Jespersen v. Harrah's Operating Co. holding an employer's grooming standards that appropriately discriminate by gender (here requiring women to wear makeup to work) are not facially discriminatory under Title VII of the Civil Rights Act of 1964, 42 U.S.C. § 2000e et seq.
 In August 2015, Schroeder found that the United States District Court for the Southern District of California's policy of indiscriminately shackling criminal defendants in all pretrial hearings violated the Constitution's Due Process Clause. Her judgment was affirmed by the narrowly divided circuit en banc, before being vacated by the unanimous Supreme Court of the United States.
 (May 14, 2021): Schroeder ruled that the EPA failed to properly examine lead standards, and that it must reconsider those standards. Schroeder concluded her opinion by writing "Consistent with our holding in this opinion that the EPA must reconsider the DLHS, we direct the EPA to reconsider the clearance levels as well in the same proceeding. Both sets of standards must work together to effectuate Congress’s intent to end the hazards of lead poisoning in our children."

Personal life 

She is married to Milton Schroeder, a professor at the Sandra Day O'Connor College of Law, and has two children.

References

External links

1940 births
Living people
20th-century American judges
American women lawyers
Arizona lawyers
Arizona state court judges
Judges of the United States Court of Appeals for the Ninth Circuit
People from Boulder, Colorado
Swarthmore College alumni
United States court of appeals judges appointed by Jimmy Carter
United States Department of Justice lawyers
University Laboratory High School (Urbana, Illinois) alumni
University of Chicago Law School alumni
20th-century American women judges